Cu Chi Wildlife Rescue Station is a center located in the Cu Chi District of Ho Chi Minh City that helps rare wild animals recover from captivity and promotes awareness of wildlife-related issues. It is administered by Wildlife at Risk, a non-government organization. It was founded in 2006 and has accepted over 4,000 distressed wild animals. The center's pangolins, bears, otters, leopard cat, biturong, horn bill gibbon, loris, douc langur and other animals may be viewed by visitors.

References

External links
 Wildlife at Risk

Wildlife rehabilitation and conservation centers